Li Mei-jhen (born 21 March 1979), also known as Jane Lee, is a Taiwanese politician.

Li was born on 21 March 1979. She attended Cheng Shiu University and completed a master's degree from the Institute of Mainland Chinese Studies at National Sun Yat-sen University (NSYSU). Li Mei-jhen then worked for her father while he served on the Kaohsiung City Council. Li sought the Kuomintang nomination for a seat on the Kaohsiung City Council in 2010, and succeeded her father in office. She represented Nanzih and Zuoying Districts.

2020 Kaohsiung mayoral by-election
In June 2020, the Kuomintang selected Li as its candidate for the 2020 Kaohsiung mayoral by-election. A number of party members considered the nomination process that led to Li's selection chaotic, and raised the potential for vote splitting following Wu Yi-jheng's entry into the race. On 22 July 2020, NSYSU stated that it had begun  that Li had plagiarized her master's degree thesis. On 23 July, Li apologized for the controversy and announced that she was "renouncing" her master's degree. NSYSU responded that the Degree Conferral Act (學位授予法) had no guidelines for allowing alumni to renounce their degrees and it would continue the investigation. The Kuomintang stated on 25 July that it would continue to support Li's candidacy.

On 15 August 2020, Li conceded the by-election to Democratic Progressive Party candidate Chen Chi-mai, congratulated him on his victory, and expressed further commitment to her post as councilor.

On 19 August 2020, NSYSU confirmed that Li Mei-jhen's degree thesis involved plagiarism, and an academic ethics committee unanimously voted to revoke her degree. Li's degree was formally revoked on 13 October 2020.

References

1979 births
Living people
21st-century Taiwanese women politicians
21st-century Taiwanese politicians
Kaohsiung City Councilors
Kuomintang politicians in Taiwan
Cheng Shiu University alumni
People involved in plagiarism controversies
National Sun Yat-sen University alumni